Mentha australis is known by the common names of river mint, native mint, native peppermint, and Australian mint. It is a mint species within the genus Mentha.

It is a native of eastern Australia, occurring in every state and territory except Western Australia. It is also naturalized on the North Island of New Zealand.

See also

List of Australian herbs and spices

References

australis
Crops originating from Australia
Lamiales of Australia
Plants described in 1810
Herbs